In neurourology, post-micturition convulsion syndrome (PMCS), also known informally as pee shivers, is the experience of shivering during or after urination. The syndrome appears to be more frequently experienced by males.

The term "post-micturition convulsion syndrome" was coined in 1994 in the online question-and-answer newspaper column The Straight Dope, when a reader enquired about the phenomenon.

Explanation 
There has yet to be any peer-reviewed research on the topic. The most plausible theory is that the shiver is a result of the autonomic nervous system getting its signals mixed up between its two main divisions:

The sympathetic nervous system (SNS), which controls bladder function, preventing urination. 
The parasympathetic nervous system (PNS), which relaxes the urethral sphincter and contracts the bladder, causing urination.

Part of the SNS response to a full bladder is the release of catecholamines (including epinephrine, norepinephrine and dopamine), which are dispatched to help restore or maintain blood pressure. When urination begins, the PNS takes over, and catecholamine production changes. It may be the change in chemical production which causes the shiver, or the switch from SNS to PNS itself which is the cause.

References 

Syndromes
Urine
1994 neologisms